The 1911 Rhode Island gubernatorial election was held on November 7, 1911. Incumbent Republican Aram J. Pothier defeated Democratic nominee Lewis A. Waterman with 53.36% of the vote.

General election

Candidates
Major party candidates
Aram J. Pothier, Republican
Lewis A. Waterman, Democratic

Other candidates
Edward W. Theinert, Socialist
Ernest L. Merry, Prohibition
John W. Leach, Socialist Labor

Results

References

1911
Rhode Island
Gubernatorial